Jonathan Charles Turteltaub (born August 8, 1963) is an American film director and producer.

Life and career
Turteltaub was born on August 8, 1963 in New York City, one of two children born to comedy writer Saul Turteltaub (best known for his work on Sanford and Son) and his wife, Shirley Steinberg. His parents are both Jewish. Turteltaub graduated from Wesleyan University and the USC School of Cinematic Arts.

He has directed successful mainstream films for the Walt Disney Studios, including; 3 Ninjas (1992), Cool Runnings (1993), While You Were Sleeping (1995), Phenomenon (1996), Instinct (1999), Disney's The Kid (2000),  National Treasure (2004), as well as its 2007 sequel National Treasure: Book of Secrets, and The Sorcerer's Apprentice (2010), as well as The Meg (2018) for Warner Brothers. Turteltaub produced the CBS television series Jericho, and also directed the show's first three episodes. In 1996, his production company Junction Entertainment had a film deal with Disney, and in 2006, signed a deal with Paramount Television, which would soon go on to become CBS Paramount Network Television.

In 2020, Turteltaub directed two episodes of NBC's Zoey's Extraordinary Playlist including the episode "Zoey's Extraordinary Glitch", which The Hollywood Reporter listed as one of the 10 best episodes of television that year.

Personal life
Turteltaub is married to British television writer and producer Amy Eldon, sister of photojournalist Dan Eldon, who was stoned to death alongside several other journalists in Somalia in 1993. Turteltaub and his family reside in Malibu, California, next door to his in-laws. He serves on the Creative Council of Represent.Us, a nonpartisan anti-corruption organization.

Ahead of the 2020 U.S. presidential election, Turteltaub directed an anti-Trump video for the Lincoln Project.

Filmography
Film

Television

References

External links

Jon Turteltaub – MIPtalk.com Interview

1963 births
Film producers from New York (state)
American television directors
German-language film directors
USC School of Cinematic Arts alumni
Wesleyan University alumni
20th-century American Jews
Living people
Film directors from New York City
21st-century American Jews